Capsule hotel, also known in the Western world as a pod hotel, is a type of hotel developed in Japan that features many small bed-sized rooms known as capsules. Capsule hotels provide cheap, basic overnight accommodation for guests who do not require or who cannot afford larger, more expensive rooms offered by more conventional hotels.

The first capsule hotel in the world opened in 1979 and was the Capsule Inn Osaka, located in the Umeda district of Osaka, Japan and designed by Kisho Kurokawa. From there, it spread to other cities within Japan. Since then, the concept has further spread to various other territories, including Belgium, China, Hong Kong, Iceland, India, Indonesia, Israel, Poland and Canada.

Description
The guest room is a chamber roughly the length and width of a single bed, with sufficient height for a hotel guest to crawl in and sit up on the bed. The chamber walls may be made of wood, metal or any rigid material, but are often fibreglass or plastic. Amenities within the room generally include a small television, air conditioning, an electronic console, and power sockets. The capsules are stacked side-by-side, two units high, with steps or ladders providing access to the second level rooms, similar to bunk beds. The open end of the capsule can be closed with a curtain or a solid door for privacy, but can be locked from the inside only.

Like a hostel, many amenities are communally shared, including toilets, showers, wireless internet, and dining rooms. In Japan, a capsule hotel may have a communal bath and sauna. Some hotels also provide restaurants, snack bars or bars (or at least vending machines), pools, and other entertainment facilities. There may be a lounge with upholstered chairs for relaxing, along with newspapers and reading material. 

Capsule hotels vary in size, from 50 or so capsules to 700, and primarily cater to men. Some capsule hotels offer separate sections for male and female guests, or even separate floors and elevators. Clothes and shoes are exchanged for a yukata and slippers on entry, and a towel and bathrobe may also be provided. Luggage and valuables are usually stored in lockers or—if available—in-room safes. Guests are asked not to smoke or eat in the capsules.

Customer base 
The benefit of these hotels are their convenience and low price, usually around ¥2000–4000 (USD –) a night.

In Japan, capsule hotels have been stereotypically used by Japanese salarymen who may be too drunk to return home safely, have missed the last train of the day to make a return trip home due to working late hours, or are too embarrassed to face their spouses. During the Japanese Recession, some unemployed or underemployed workers who had become homeless during the crisis temporarily rented capsules by the month. As of 2010, these customers made up 30% of visitors at the Capsule Hotel Shinjuku 510 in Tokyo.

Criticism and disadvantages 
Due to the arrangement of capsules, Web Urbanist has compared the beds in capsule hotels to corpse drawers in a morgue. In addition, because of the small interior space, Forbes advised that claustrophobic guests should not use capsule hotels.

Some hotels may not provide air conditioning in the capsules, leading to poor air flow, especially with the privacy curtain or door shut; furthermore, due to the close proximity of guests, pods with thin plastic walls easily transmit sounds made by other guests bumping into the walls.

Because some capsule hotels are designed for single-night stays, guests intending to stay for more than one day must check out and back in again every day.

See also 

 Sleepbox
 Nap pod
 Transit hotel
 Bedspace apartment
 Shipping container architecture
 Flophouse

References

External links
 A list of capsule hotels

Hotel types
Hotels in Japan
Homelessness
Japanese inventions
1979 introductions
1979 establishments in Japan